The 1975 Stanley Cup Finals was the championship series of the National Hockey League's (NHL) 1974–75 season, and the culmination of the 1975 Stanley Cup playoffs. It was contested between the Buffalo Sabres and the defending champion Philadelphia Flyers. The Flyers would win the best-of-seven series, four games to two. This was the first Final to have two non-"Original Six" teams since the 1967 expansion, and also the first contested by any team that had joined the league after 1967 (the Sabres were part of the 1970 expansion). The 1975 Flyers are the last Stanley Cup championship team to be composed solely of Canadian-born players.

Paths to the Finals

Buffalo defeated the Chicago Black Hawks 4–1 and the Montreal Canadiens 4–2 to advance to the final.

Philadelphia defeated the Toronto Maple Leafs 4–0 and the New York Islanders 4–3 to make it to the final.

Game summaries
Bernie Parent was the outgunned Flyers' best player, allowing only 12 goals in the six games, capped with a shutout. He became the first player to win the Conn Smythe Trophy for two consecutive years. In the deciding game six played in Buffalo, the Sabres' offensive big guns rained shot after shot on Parent in an all-out effort to turn the series around, but Parent remained perfect. He stopped French Connection linemates Gilbert Perreault and Rick Martin on a 2–1 late in period two that had Flyers broadcaster Gene Hart screaming into his microphone:

Out come the Sabres...two on one...Perreault and Martin with just Dupont back...Perrault to Martin...He's in...Shot!....save by Parent...and he hangs on!...Oh baby!

The dramatic stop by Parent took the offensive energy out of the Sabres and the Flyers scored two third-period goals to take the championship.

Fog and the bat
The third game of the series was the Fog Game. Due to unusual heat in Buffalo in May 1975, and the lack of an air conditioning system in the auditorium, portions of the game were played in heavy fog. During stoppages of play, rink employees skated around the arena ice carrying bed sheets in an attempt to dispel the fog. Players, officials, and the puck were invisible to many spectators. The fog began to form just minutes after another odd incident: A bat in the arena, which flew above and around the players for the majority of the game, until Sabres center Jim Lorentz killed it with his stick. Many superstitious Buffalo fans considered this to be an 'evil omen', pertaining to the result of the series. The game continued and the Sabres won thanks to Rene Robert's goal in overtime.

Series box score

Team rosters

Philadelphia Flyers

|}

Buffalo Sabres

|}

Stanley Cup engraving
The 1975 Stanley Cup was presented to Flyers captain Bobby Clarke by NHL President Clarence Campbell following the Flyers 2–0 win over the Sabres in game six.

The following Flyers players and staff had their names engraved on the Stanley Cup

1974–75 Philadelphia Flyers

See also
 1974–75 NHL season

Notes

References
 
 

Stanley Cup
Stanley Cup Finals
Buffalo Sabres games
Philadelphia Flyers games
Ice hockey competitions in Philadelphia
Sports competitions in Buffalo, New York
1975 in sports in Pennsylvania
May 1975 sports events in the United States
20th century in Buffalo, New York
1975 in sports in New York (state)
1970s in Philadelphia